Cleaver is a surname which may refer to:

People
 Anna Cleaver, triathlete from New Zealand
 Billy Cleaver (1921–2003), Welsh rugby union player
 Eldridge Cleaver (1935–1998), American writer and political activist
 Emanuel Cleaver (born 1944), U.S. Representative for Missouri and United Methodist pastor
 Euseby Cleaver (1746–1819), Anglican Archbishop of Dublin
 Fred Cleaver (1885–1968), English footballer
 Gerald Cleaver (musician) (born 1963), African-American jazz drummer
 Gerald B. Cleaver, physics associate professor at Baylor University
 Gordon Cleaver (1910–1994), British Second World War fighter ace and skier
 Harry Cleaver (born 1944), American Marxian economics retired professor
 Harry Cleaver (footballer) (1880–?), English footballer
 Hughes Cleaver (1892–1980), Canadian politician
 Kathleen Cleaver (born 1945), American law professor
 Naomi Cleaver (born 1967), British design consultant and interior designer
 Richard Cleaver (1917–2006), Australian politician
 Skip Cleaver (1944-2922), American politician
 Solomon Cleaver (1855–1939), Canadian minister and storyteller
 Sue Cleaver (born 1965), English actress
 Val Cleaver (1917–1977), British rocket engineer
 William Cleaver (1742–1815), English bishop and academic

Fictional characters
 The Cleavers, a family from the American television sitcom Leave It to Beaver:
June Cleaver, Theodore's mother
Theodore Cleaver, the title character, a boy nicknamed "Beaver"
Wally Cleaver, Theodore's older brother
Ward Cleaver, Theodore's father